Shiva Narwal is an Indian sport shooter. He won the bronze medal in the ISSF world cup 10m Air Pistol mixed event along with Palak.

References

Living people
2000s births
Indian male sport shooters
21st-century Indian people